Darreh-ye Lirgeh Durak (also Romanized as Darreh-ye Līrgeh Dūraḵ) is a village in Darreh Kayad Rural District, Sardasht District, Dezful County, Khuzestan Province, Iran. At the 2006 census, its population was 30, in 6 families.

References 

Populated places in Dezful County